Wu Yi (born November 3, 1990), also known as Philip Wu and Philip Lau, is a Chinese pop singer who was the second runner-up of Super Boy, a singing talent show of Hunan TV in 2010. He is also the champion and second runner-up in Canadian and North American area of the "Karaoke King" competition in 2009. From Hunan province.

Songs

Filmography

TV drama

Film

Happy Boy 
Lau's attendance experience at the 2010 Hunan TV Super Boy is listed below.

References 

http://www.eemedia.cn/player_view.aspx?sort_gl=70
http://data.ent.sina.com.cn/star/12714.html
http://www.chinanews.com/yl/2011/05-18/3049042.shtml

External links 
http://ent.hunantv.com/v/mxgw/kn/wuyi/
http://blog.sina.com.cn/wyxplyf

University of Toronto alumni
1990 births
People from Kowloon
Living people
Hong Kong male singers